Philipos (Philip) C. Loizou (November 10, 1965 – July 22, 2012) was Professor in the Department of Electrical Engineering (EE), Erik Jonsson School of Engineering & Computer Science at the University of Texas at Dallas (UTD).

Career 
Loizou was an assistant professor at the University of Arkansas, Little Rock (1996 to 1999) prior to joining the Erik Jonsson School of Engineering and Computer Science, where he helped co-found the Center of Robust Speech Systems (CRSS). He established the Speech Processing and Cochlear Implant Laboratories at the University of Texas at Dallas and held the Cecil and Ida Green Chair in the Department of Electrical Engineering since 2009. Loizou developed a noisy speech corpus known as NOIZEUS.

References

External links 
 Philipos Loizou's Homepage
 CI lab 
 Speech Processing lab

University of Texas at Dallas faculty
1965 births
2012 deaths
Audiologists
Ira A. Fulton Schools of Engineering alumni
Cypriot emigrants to the United States